Lars Hedegaard (born 19 September 1942) is a Danish journalist and author. He established the Danish Free Press Society in 2004, which was turned into the International Free Press Society in 2009.

Career
Originally a high school teacher, he was one of the editors of the Fundamental historie series of books, and edited a volume of the Hvem Hvad Hvor ("Who What Where") yearbook in the 1980s. He also worked as a journalist. In the 2000s, he wrote a column called "Roughly Said" for the newspaper Berlingske Tidende. A self-described Marxist, he was politically active as a member of the Danish Socialist Workers Party until 1982.

Hedegaard is known as a critic of Islam. According to him, he was dismissed from Berlingske Tidende after he ignored repeated requests from the management to mitigate his criticism of Islam. In 2007 he took part in the international counter-jihad conference in Brussels. On July 4, 2014, a new animated film that he co-produced entitled Aisha and Muhammad was released. The film focuses on the life of the fifty-year-old Islamic prophet Muhammad and his marriage to a then six-year-old Aisha. The film was directed by Pakistani director Imran Firasat.

Trial
In 2011, he was convicted of hate speech under the Article 266b of the Danish Penal Code, and fined 5,000 kroner. He had made critical remarks against the Islamic society, which included “girls in Muslim families are raped by their uncles, their cousins, or their dad.” He later clarified that he did not intend to accuse all the Muslims of abusing their children. He appealed the verdict, and in 2012, the Supreme Court acquitted him in a 7-0 decision.

Assassination attempt in 2013
On 5 February 2013, an unknown person posing as a postman attempted to shoot Hedegaard in his home. The attempt failed, and the assailant escaped. The Danish Prime Minister Helle Thorning-Schmidt condemned the attack and said the case was even more severe if the motive was to prevent Hedegaard from using his free speech. Danish Muslims responded by rallying to defend Hedegaard and to defend his right to free speech. The Islam Society, which had been heavily involved in the protest against his cartoons and helped to publicise their opposition internationally, stated that it regretted its role during the controversy, and the Danish branch of Minhaj-ul-Quran demonstrated outside the City Hall in defense of Hedegaard and free speech.

In November 2016, the US State Department issued a note, designating three persons as terror-operatives: "Basil Hassan is an external operations plotter for ISIL. In 2013, Hassan was accused of shooting Lars Hedegaard, a 70-year old Danish author and journalist. After being arrested in Turkey in 2014, he was released as part of an alleged exchange for 49 hostages held by the Islamic State of Iraq and the Levant (ISIL). After his release, Hassan was believed to have travelled to Syria to join ISIL."

Personal life
Hedegaard was born in Horsens, and has been married twice. In 1969, he converted to Judaism in conjunction with his marriage to his first wife, Barbara Levin of Los Angeles. Hedegaard has three children and one step-daughter.

References 

1942 births
Converts to Judaism
Counter-jihad activists
Danish communists
Danish male writers
Jewish Danish writers
Jewish socialists
Living people
Trials in Denmark
Danish editors
People convicted of racial hatred offences
People from Horsens
Berlingske people
Dagbladet Information people
Danish critics of Islam